The 1888 United States presidential election in Tennessee took place on November 6, 1888, as part of the 1888 United States presidential election. Tennessee voters chose 12 representatives, or electors, to the Electoral College, who voted for president and vice president.

Background and vote
For over a century after the Civil War, Tennessee’s white citizenry was divided according to partisan loyalties established in that war. Unionist regions covering almost all of East Tennessee, Kentucky Pennyroyal-allied Macon County, and the five West Tennessee Highland Rim counties of Carroll, Henderson, McNairy, Hardin and Wayne voted Republican – generally by landslide margins – as they saw the Democratic Party as the “war party” who had forced them into a war they did not wish to fight. Contrariwise, the rest of Middle and West Tennessee who had supported and driven the state’s secession was equally fiercely Democratic as it associated the Republicans with Reconstruction. After the state’s white landowning class re-established its rule in the early 1870s, black and Unionist white combined to forge adequate support for the GOP to produce a competitive political system for two decades, although during this era the Republicans could only capture statewide offices when the Democratic Party was divided on this issue of payment of state debt. 

White Democrats in West Tennessee were always aiming to eliminate black political influence, and during the 1880s they attempted to do this by election fraud and stuffing of ballot boxes. During the 1888 elections, this fraud increased substantially and the GOP’s fortunes showed a decline at the state level to just 35 out of 132 state legislators. This would lead to much more drastic changes in the future, but in the presidential race Democratic nominee and incumbent President Grover Cleveland, running with the former Senator and Chief Justice of the Supreme Court of Ohio Allen G. Thurman won only 52.26 percent of the popular vote, against former Indiana Senator Benjamin Harrison (R-Indiana), running with Levi P. Morton, the 31st governor of New York who gained 45.76 percent. Cleveland’s margin was, given the political changes taking place, only a small improvement over his 1884 win in Tennessee; however, he did re-establish the majority-black far southwestern part of the state as rock-ribbed Democratic until the party turned towards Civil Rights under Harry S. Truman.

The Union Labor Party chose Alson Streeter, a former Illinois state representative, and Charles E. Cunningham as their presidential and vice-presidential candidates and received 0.02% of the vote. The Prohibition Party ran brigadier general Clinton B. Fisk and John A. Brooks and received 1.97% of the vote.

Results

Results by county

Notes

References 

Tennessee
1888
1888 Tennessee elections